Mount Gunner is a partially snow-covered peak,  high, that rises from the southern part of the Morris Heights in the Queen Alexandra Range of Antarctica. The peak was examined by the Ohio State University Geological Party, 1967–68, and was named by the Advisory Committee on Antarctic Names for John D. Gunner, a geologist who was a member of the party to this and other Antarctic localities in three summer seasons, 1967–70.

References

External links

Mountains of the Ross Dependency
Shackleton Coast